Friheden (meaning The Freedom in English) is a suburb in Hvidovre municipality, located 8 km south-east from central Copenhagen. The area is a working-class suburb and most activity takes place around the Friheden S-Train station, where a shopping mall also is placed.

Two S-train stations: Friheden and Åmarken exist in Friheden.

References

Geography of Copenhagen
Hvidovre Municipality